Dong-ha, also spelled Tong-ha, is a Korean masculine given name. Its meaning differs based on the hanja used to write each syllable of the name. There are 24 hanja with the reading "dong" and 24 hanja with the reading "ha" on the South Korean government's official list of hanja which may be registered for use in given names.

People with this name include
Kim Tong-ha (김동하, 1920–1993), South Korean general, one of the leaders of the May 16 coup of 1961
Lee Dong-ha (born 1942), South Korean novelist
Chung Dong-ha (born 1980 as Chung Jae-hwan), South Korean singer, vocalist of rock band Boohwal

Fictional characters with this name include:
Kang Dong-ha from 2006 South Korean television series One Fine Day
Park Dong-ha from 2009 South Korean film A Season of Good Rain
Seo Dong-ha from 2014 South Korean television series Golden Cross

See also
List of Korean given names

References

Korean masculine given names